Afzal H. Khan is a Bangladesh Nationalist Party politician and the former Member of Parliament from Mymensingh-1.

Career 
Khan served as the news editor of The Daily Star. He was elected to Parliament from Mymensingh-1 in 2001 as a candidate of Bangladesh Nationalist Party. He is the convenor of the Mymensingh District of Bangladesh Nationalist Party. He competed in the 2008 Bangladesh General election as the candidate of Bangladesh Nationalist Party against the Bangladesh Awami League candidate, Promode Mankin.

References 

Bangladesh Nationalist Party politicians
Living people
8th Jatiya Sangsad members
Year of birth missing (living people)
People from Mymensingh District
6th Jatiya Sangsad members